The Popular Fighters Group, also referred to as Group of Popular Rebels (Greek: Ομάδα Λαϊκών Αγωνιστών), is a Greek left-wing terrorist group that is anti-imperialist, anti-capitalist. Formed as a response to the Greek Government-debt crisis the group has carried out attacks primarily targeting the Government of Greece and German organizations in Greece.

Attacks

2013 
January 14, 2013 - Gunmen attacked the headquarters of the governing New Democracy party in Athens. No one was injured.
December 30, 2013 - Gunmen fired on the residence of the German ambassador, Wolfgang Dold. No one was injured.

2014 
January 12, 2014 - The group claimed to have fired rocket at the Greek headquarters of Mercedes-Benz in Athens. Greek investigators had not noted such an attack; however, they later discovered evidence that a rocket had indeed been fired but missed its target, instead landing in a nearby field.
April 10, 2014 - The group is believed to be responsible for a car bombing outside of the headquarters of the Bank of Greece in Athens. No one was hurt in the attack.

2017 
In December 2017, the group claimed responsibility for a bombing against the Court of Appeals in Athens. The group press release stated that "Justice is like a snake. It will only bite those barefoot" as justification for the attack.

References 

Left-wing militant groups in Greece
Organizations established in 2013
Terrorism in Greece
Anti-German sentiment in Europe